Scythris jodhpursoides is a moth of the family Scythrididae. It was described by Bengt Å. Bengtsson in 2016. It is found in Kenya.

Etymology
The species name refers to the appearance of the male genitalia, where the valvae remind of riding breeches, in English sometimes called jodhpurs after the Indian word for this kind of trousers.

References

jodhpursoides
Moths described in 2014